NH 32 may refer to:
 National Highway 32 (India)
 New Hampshire Route 32, United States